Capital Punishment is the third studio album by Unit:187, released on April 8, 2003 by COP International.

Reception
Fabryka Music Magazine lauded Capital Punishment for its interesting direction supported by good arrangements and production combined with Unit:187's decision to move towards a mainstream direction. Trubie Turner of ReGen said the album captures the band at their "despite its impressive production and composition, Out for Blood definitely suffers from a tendency to blend together due to its lack of divergence in tempo and gives an overall feeling of being stuck in one gear the entire time" and "an impressive, heavy, and gritty coldwave showcase that unfortunately comes across as too restrained."

Track listing

Personnel
Adapted from the Capital Punishment liner notes.

Unit:187
 Tod Law – lead vocals, instruments, production
 John Morgan – instruments, production

Additional personnel
 Sean Lawson – remixing (9)
 Ross Redhead – remixing (9)
 Serena Whitters – backing vocals (3)

Production and design
 Ken Marshall – mastering
 Chris Peterson – additional production (2, 4, 5), remixing (9)
 Anthony Valcic – mixing, editing
 Jeff Walker – cover art, design

Release history

References

External links 
 Capital Punishment at iTunes
 

2003 albums
Unit:187 albums
COP International albums